Rhododendron lochiae is a species of plant in the family Ericaceae, and is one of only two species of the genus Rhododendron that are native to Australia. It is found only in restricted areas of mountain–top cloud forest habitats within the Wet Tropics of Queensland World Heritage Site. The other species, Rhododendron viriosum, was only formally classified as a separate species in 2002.

Description
Rhododendron lochiae is a small shrub with glossy, elliptic leaves. In spring and summer it produces terminal clusters of waxy, red bell-shaped flowers. Each flower is about 5 cm long and 3 cm wide, and occurs in groups of up to six per cluster.

Taxonomy
The species was first described by Ferdinand von Mueller in 1887 who gave it the specific epithet lochae in honour of Lady Loch, a patron of horticulture in Australia and wife of the  Governor of Victoria. The spelling was later amended to lochiae. The type specimen was collected by William A. Sayer and A. Davidson who came across the species while ascending Mount Bellenden Ker.

It is classified within subgenus Rhododendron, section Vireya, subsection Euvireya.

Forms with a straight corolla tube that were previously included within the species were reclassified by Craven in 2002 as R. viriosum. Presently this segregate species is not recognised and its name has been resumed as a synonym of this R. lochiae. Furthermore, those specimens with a curved corolla tube, at one stage known as R. notiale Craven, remain within the present definition of R. lochiae. Therefore, all Australian plants occurring in the wild are, presently, officially known as R. lochiae.

Hybrids
A large number of hybrids have been produced from R. lochiae crossed with other species in the section Vireya.

Distribution
Rhododendron lochiae occurs in cloud forests on mountain tops in the World Heritage Wet Tropics of north eastern Queensland. It is found in protected situations, often situated in rocky areas with high rainfall and high humidity.

Cultivation
The first record of cultivation related to a specimen which was growing, and subsequently flowering, at Kew Gardens in 1939.
Plants require good drainage, constant moisture, good light and a semi-shaded position protected from frost and hot sun.

References

 Association of Societies for Growing Australian Plants (ASGAP) Rhododendron lochiae
Vireya Rhododendrons: Rhododendron lochiae

lochiae
Flora of Queensland
Ericales of Australia
Taxa named by Ferdinand von Mueller